Mercer Caverns is a show cave located one mile north of Murphys in Calaveras County California. It is named after the gold prospector Walter J. Mercer who discovered the caves around 1885 and filed a claim.  The caverns have a large number of speleothems, stalactites, and stalagmites.  It is formed in a marble unit known as the Calaveras Formation. It also contains a large display of aragonite frostwork.

The standard tour of the cave descends 160 feet, 208 steps down and 232 up in a traverse between the natural and an artificial entrance. The cave was mapped in 1986 to a length of 3389 feet and a total depth of 192 feet. The map can be viewed on the cave's web site.

Images

See also
 Stalagmite
 Stalactite

Notes

External links

Mercer Caverns official site
Exploring the Caves of Calaveras
Show caves entry for Mercer Caverns

Landforms of Calaveras County, California
Limestone caves
Show caves in the United States
Caves of California
Tourist attractions in Calaveras County, California